Kristi Gold is an American writer of over 25 romance novels since 2000.

Biography
Kristi Gold decided at the age of twenty to write her first book. In 2000 her first book was published. Gold is married to a physician, and they have three children. They currently reside in Central Texas.

Awards
1996 Romance Writers of America Double Golden Heart Finalist
2001 Romance Writers of America RITA Nominee for Best First Book, Cowboy for Keeps
Romantic Times W.I.S.H. Award
2004 National Reader's Choice Winner, Best Short Contemporary Series
Romantic Times BookClub Reviewer's Choice Winner for 2003, 2004, and 2005 Best Silhouette Desire
2004 Romantic Times BookClub Lifetime Achievement Award Nominee for Series Storyteller of the Year
Seven No. 1 Waldenbook Series Best-sellers

Bibliography

For Keeps Series
Cowboy for Keeps (2000)
Doctor for Keeps (2000)

Single novels
Her Ardent Sheikh (2001)
His Sheltering Arms (2001)
His E-mail Order Wife (2002)
The Sheikh's Bidding (2003)
Marooned with a Millionaire (2003)
Expecting the Sheikh's Baby (2003)
Fit for a Sheikh (2004)
Mistaken for a Mistress (2005)
A Most Shocking Revelation (2005)
Law of Attraction (2006)
House of Midnight Fantasies (2006)
Damage Control (2006)
Fall from Grace (2007)

Marrying An M.D.
Dr. Dangerous (2002)
Dr. Desirable (2002)
Dr. Destiny (2002)

Royal Wager Series
Persuading the Playboy King (2004)
Unmasking the Maverick Prince (2004)
Daring the Dynamic Sheikh (2004)
Persuading the Playboy King / Unmasking the Maverick Prince (omnibus) (2005)

O'Brien Series
The Pregnancy Negotiation (2006)
Executive Seduction (2006)
Through Jenna's Eyes (2007)

Omnibus in collaboration
Millionaire Men (2002) (with Cindy Gerard)
Taming Her Man (2002) (with B.J. James)
Doctors in Demand (2002) (with Meagan McKinney)
Navy Seal Dad / Dr.Desirable (2002) (with Metsy Hingle)
The Tycoon's Temptation / Dr. Destiny (2003) (with Katherine Garbera)
Renegade Millionaire / Cinco (2003) (with Linda Conrad)
The Royal and the Runaway Bride / His E-mail Order Wife (2003) (with Kathryn Jensen)
Baby / Desert Warrior (2003) (with Nalina Singh)
Beckett's Convenient Bride / The Sheikh's Bidding (2004) (with Dixie Browning)
Marooned with a Millionaire / The Gentrys – Abby (2004) (with Linda Conrad)
Challenged by the Sheikh: Dynasties: The Danforths (2004) (with Ann Major)
The Bride Tamer (2004) (with Ann Major)
Fit for A Sheikh / Shut Up and Kiss Me (2004) (with Sara Orwig)
Challenged by the Sheikh / Hot Contact (2004) (with Susan Crosby)
Expecting the Sheikh's Baby / Born to be Wild (2004) (with Anne Marie Winston)
Between Duty and Desire / Persuading the Playboy King (2004) (with Leanne Banks)
Royal Dad / Unmasking the Maverick Prince (2004) (with Leanne Banks)
Taken by Storm (2005) (with Kathie DeNosky and Laura Wright) (Whirlwind / Upsurge / Wildfire)
Sheik and the Princess Bride / Daring the Dynamic Sheikh (2005) (with Susan Mallery)
The Boss Man's Fortune / Challenged by the Sheikh (2005) (with Kathryn Jensen)
Pretending with the Playboy / Fit for a Sheikh (2005) (with Cathleen Galitz)
Princes of the Desert (2005) (with Alexandra Sellers)
Betrayed Birthright / Mistaken for a Mistrress (2006) (with Sheri WhiteFeather)
House of Midnight Fantasies / Rags-to-Riches Wife (2006) (with Metsy Hingle)
Highly Compromised Position / Most Shocking Revelation (2006) (with Sara Orwig)
House of Midnight Fantasies / Single Demand (2007) (with Margaret Allison)
The Connellys: Alexandra, Drew and Tara (2007) (with Cindy Gerard and Muriel Jensen)
Dangerous Desires (2007) (with Kathie DeNosky and Laura Wright)
Pregnancy Negotiation / Marriage of Revenge (2007) (with Sheri WhiteFeather)
Morning-After Proposal / Executive Seduction (2007) (with Sheri WhiteFeather)

References and sources
Kristi Gold's Official Website
Kristi Gold at eHarlequin
Kristi Gold at Mills & Boon

External links
Kristi Gold at Fantastic Fiction

American romantic fiction writers
Living people
Year of birth missing (living people)